James Franklin Ballard (July 16, 1851 - April 23, 1931) was an American entrepreneur and art collector specializing in rugs from Asia and the Middle East, and medieval prints by such artists as Albrecht Dürer. During his lifetime his art collection achieved national fame among art critics and collectors.

Art Collection

Ballard traveled the world in search of art to buy, but most especially rugs. He started collecting rugs in 1905 He traveled over 470,000 miles through Southeast Asia, China, the Caucasus Mountains, India, Northern Africa, the Middle East, and all over Europe. His travels found him in Egypt during the opening of Tutankhamun’s tomb in 1922. He was briefly imprisoned by the Greek government, and witnessed the Great Fire of Smyrna (now Izmir).

The earliest of Ballard’s rugs are from the 10th century. In 1922 Ballard presented to the Metropolitan Museum of Art in New York, a collection of 126 oriental rugs that at the time was valued at half a million dollars. Later he brought an additional two rugs, one of which featured the coat of arms of Tamerlane, the founder of the Timurid Empire. He also gave a substantial collection of rugs to the Saint Louis Art Museum.

Biography

Ballard was born in Ashtabula, Ohio to James Ballard and Eliza (Heath) Ballard. His parents owned a large tract of timber land in northern Michigan near Lapere.

Career
Despite the fact that his father had ample money from his timber farm, the younger Ballard chose to join the circus and travel the country at a young age. Later he started drug stores around the country and settled in Saint Louis, Missouri. While in Saint Louis, he became involved with the wholesale drug store chain, Richardson & Company.

In 1882 Ballard withdrew from Richardson & Company, and started his own business again, the Ballard Snow Liniment Company. This company manufactured one of the most widely advertised and distributed proprietary remedies of the time. It was the sales of this medicine that made his fortune. After 1923 his business was called James F. Ballard Incorporated of which he was the chief owner, and in later years the treasurer. Besides Ballard's Snow Liniment, he also sold: Swaim's Panacea, White's Cream Vermifuge, Campho Phenique, Smith's Bile Beans, Ozmanlis Nerve Pills, and Littell's Liquid Sulphur, all of which were advertised in his self-published book: Ballard's Book of the Great War.

Ballard also owned the Henry B. Platte company of New York. He was the director of the Mechanics-American National Bank, and of its successor, the First National Bank & Union Trust Company of Saint Louis.

Memberships
 The National Academy of Design in New York
 The Congressional Country Club in Washington, D.C.
 The Missouri Historical Society in Saint Louis
 The Saint Louis Archaeological Society
 The Saint Louis Club
 The Bankers Club of New York
 The Salmagundi Club of New York
 The Economic Club of New York
 The Lotus Club of New York

The personal papers of James F. Ballard are housed in the archives of the Saint Louis Art Museum. One can view a description of their contents at this link. They are available to researchers by appointment.

Footnotes

References

Ballard, James F. Ballard's Book of the Great War; Containing Many Historical Effects Pertaining to the Great Struggle, Self-published by James F. Ballard, St. Louis, MO
Ballard, James F. (September 16, 1916), Catalogue of Antique Oriental Rugs; Collection of James F. Ballard, Self-published by James F. Ballard, St. Louis, MO
Greater St. Louis (November 1921), "Hobby of Collecting Antique Rugs Brings Honor to St. Louisan"
John Herron Art Institute 1924, Ballard Collection of Oriental Rugs, Self-Published by James F. Ballard
The New York Evening World May 22, 1922, "James Ballard gives $500,000 worth of rare rugs to the Metropolitan Museum"
The New York Herald (March 13, 1927), "Rug Collector Who has Covered 460,000 Miles Likes Egypt Best"
Derrough, Peggy (November 28, 1922), "$500,000 Rug Collection Now at Art Institute; Gathered by J. F. Ballard, Who Traveled 275,000 Miles in Searches", Chicago Evening Post
Saint Louis Art Museum 1982, Archival Record for James F. Ballard. Retrieved on July 6, 2007
St. Louis Globe-Democrat (October 26, 1922), "Ballard Saw Burning of Smyrna, Risked Life in Quest for Rare Rugs; Made War Prisoner by Greeks in Hotel Bombarded by Turks, St. Louisan Brings Back Priceless Objects He Has Sought for 17 Years"
St. Louis Post Dispatch (November 22, 1922), "$5000 Oil Painting Given to the City Art Museum"
Shoemaker, Floyd Calvin LL.D. 1943, Missouri and Missourians; Land of Contrasts and People of Achievements, Lewis Publishing Company, Chicago, IL

External links
Exhibition catalogs of Oriental rugs from the collection of James F. Ballard
Exhibition of carpets from the Ballard collection, 2022 at the Currier Museum of Art in Manchester, New Hampshire. 

American art collectors
People from Ashtabula, Ohio
Writers from St. Louis
American male writers
1851 births
1931 deaths